Bass-bar may refer to:
Bass bar, a brace running from the foot of the neck to a position under the bridge in many string instruments
Short for bass-baritone, a singing voice